Nicolai "Nico" W. Chastel de Boinville (born 14 August 1989) is an English horse racing jockey who competes in National Hunt racing. De Boinville has ridden more Grade One winners than any British jumps jockey currently active.

Early life 
The son of an insurance broker, from 2002 to 2007 de Boinville was educated at Bradfield College, a boarding independent school for boys in the village of Bradfield in Berkshire, followed by the University of Newcastle upon Tyne. He had initially intended to study Politics at Newcastle, but left during his first year, in order to pursue a career in horse racing.

Life and career 
De Boinville started his racing career as a stable lad at Nicky Henderson's Seven Barrows stables.

After being a professional jockey for just over a year, de Boinville won the 2015 Cheltenham Gold Cup riding Coneygree for trainer Mark Bradstock. Since, de Boinville has partnered horses such as Altior, Shiskin, Sprinter Sacre and Might Bite to his total 15 victories at the Cheltenham Festival.

Outside of Britain, de Boinville has won two Grade 1 races. In Ireland, he partnered Marie's Rock to win the 2022 Mares Champion Hurdle at Punchestown.  Meanwhile in 2019, he won the Grand National Hurdle Stakes at Far Hills, USA with Brain Power.

He and his wife Serena (née Cookson) have a daughter, Antigoni Shaunagh Chastel de Boinville, born on 3 July 2019.

Cheltenham Festival winners (16) 
 Cheltenham Gold Cup – (1) Coneygree (2015)
 Queen Mother Champion Chase – (3) – Sprinter Sacre (2016) Altior (2018, 2019)
 Champion Hurdle - Constitution Hill (2023)
 Arkle Challenge Trophy – (2) – Altior (2017), Shishkin (2021)
 RSA Insurance Novices' Chase – (1) Might Bite (2017)
 Supreme Novices' Hurdle – (3) – Altior (2016), Shishkin (2020), Constitution Hill (2022)
 David Nicholson Mares' Hurdle – (1) –  Marie's Rock (2022)
 Triumph Hurdle – (1) Pentland Hills (2019)
 Golden Miller Novices' Chase – (1) Chantry House (2021)
 Coral Cup – (2) Whisper (2014), William Henry (2019)

Major wins 
 Great Britain
 Anniversary 4-Y-O Novices' Hurdle – (1) Pentland Hills (2019)
 Ascot Chase - (1)  Shishkin (2023) 
 Betway Bowl – (1) Might Bite (2018)
 Celebration Chase – (2) – Sprinter Sacre (2016), Altior (2017)
 Christmas Hurdle – (3)Verdana Blue (2018), Epatante (2021), Constitution Hill (2022)
 Clarence House Chase – (2) Altior (2019), Shishkin (2022)
 Fighting Fifth Hurdle - (1)  Constitution Hill (2022) 
 Kauto Star Novices' Chase – (1) Conyegree (2015)
 King George VI Chase – (1) Might Bite (2017)
 Liverpool Hurdle – (1) Whisper (2015)
 Maghull Novices' Chase – (1)  Shishkin (2021) 
 Mildmay Novices' Chase – (2) Might Bite (2017), Chantry House (2021)
 Sefton Novices' Hurdle – (1) Santini (2018)
 Tingle Creek Chase – (1) Altior (2018)
 Tolworth Novices' Hurdle – (1) Constitution Hill (2022)

 Ireland
 Mares Champion Hurdle – (1) Marie's Rock (2022)

 United States
 Grand National Hurdle Stakes – (1) Brain Power (2019)

References 

1989 births
Living people
Alumni of Newcastle University
English jockeys
People educated at Bradfield College